Knutton Halt railway station is a disused railway station in Staffordshire, England.

Situated between Knutton village and Knutton Forge, the station was not much used and was an early closure under London, Midland and Scottish railway ownership, closing in September 1926.

Present day

No traces of the halt site remain, but the former trackbed is now a greenway.

References
Notes

Sources
 
 

Disused railway stations in Stoke-on-Trent
Former North Staffordshire Railway stations
Railway stations in Great Britain closed in 1926
Railway stations in Great Britain opened in 1905